"Your Heart Belongs to Me" is a song by The Supremes.

Your Heart Belongs to Me may also refer to:
 
 "Your Heart Belongs to Me" (Hind song), the Dutch entry in the Eurovision Song Contest 2008
 Your Heart Belongs to Me (novel), a novel by Dean Koontz
 "My Heart Belongs to Me" (Barbra Streisand song)
 "Your Heart Belongs to Me" (The Supremes song)